Mohammad Abdul Haque (1918-1996) was a Bangladeshi bureaucrat and government minister.

Early life
Haque was born on 1 January 1918 at Kamalpur, Zakiganj Upazila, Sylhet District, Assam, British India. He graduated from Murari Chand College in 1942 with a B.A. in English.

Career
Haque passed the Assam Public Service Commission examination in 1943 and was appointed to the police with the rank of Deputy Superintendent. He opted to join the Pakistan Police Service after the Partition of India in 1947. He served as the District Superintendent of police of Dhaka District, Mymensingh District, Noakhali District, and Rangpur District. In 1959, he was awarded the President Police Medal. In 1960, he was made the Additional Inspector General of Police. He was awarded the Tamgha-i-Pakistan in 1963. From 1965 to 1969, he served as the chairman of the Road Transport Corporation. He received the Sitara-i-Khidmat award from the Government of Pakistan in 1969.

Haque founded a hospital after retirement. His hospital served as a shelter for civilians during Bangladesh Liberation war. He joined politics in the 1970s and was elected to Parliament in 1979 as an independent candidate. From 1985 to 1986, he served as the Minister of Land Administration and Land Reforms in the cabinet of President Hussain Mohammad Ershad. He received the Bhasani Medal and Sher-e-Bangla Medal award for his philanthropic contribution.

Death
Haque died on 6 April 1996 in Dhaka, Bangladesh.

References

1918 births
1996 deaths
2nd Jatiya Sangsad members
Pakistani police officers
Land ministers of Bangladesh
People from Zakiganj Upazila
Murari Chand College alumni